The New York City Housing Authority (NYCHA) is a public development corporation which provides public housing in New York City, and is the largest public housing authority in North America. Created in 1934 as the first agency of its kind in the United States, it aims to provide decent, affordable housing for low- and moderate-income New Yorkers throughout the five boroughs of New York City. NYCHA also administers a citywide Section 8 Leased Housing Program in rental apartments. NYCHA developments include single and double family houses, apartment units, singular floors, and shared small building units, and commonly have large income disparities with their respective surrounding neighborhood or community. These developments, particularly those including large-scale apartment buildings, are often referred to in popular culture as "projects."

The New York City Housing Authority's goal is to increase opportunities for low- and moderate-income New Yorkers by providing affordable housing and facilitating access to public service and community services. More than 500,000 New Yorkers reside in NYCHA's 335 public housing developments across the City's five boroughs. Another 235,000 receive subsidized rental assistance in private homes through the NYCHA-administered Section 8 Leased Housing Program.

List of properties

History 
NYCHA was created in 1934 to help alleviate the housing crisis caused by the Great Depression during Mayor Fiorello H. LaGuardia’s administration and was the first agency in the United States to provide publicly funded housing. The agency used the developments to practice slum-clearance and establish model affordable housing for the city. In 1935, NYCHA completed its first development, the First Houses, located on the Lower East Side of Manhattan. The parcel of land the houses were located on were purchased from Vincent Astor and the city used eminent domain to secure the remaining property. However, the construction of the First Houses used existing apartment buildings to renovate which proved too costly.

NYCHA's first two "new from the ground up" developments were Harlem River in 1937 and Williamsburg in 1938. Both are noted for their art-deco style of architecture, which are unique in public housing. These developments were segregated based on race with Harlem River being black-only and Williamsburg white-only.

The Authority boomed in partnership with Robert Moses after World War II as a part of Moses' plan to clear old tenements and remake New York as a modern city. Moses indicated later in life that he was disappointed at how the public housing system fell into decline and disrepair. The majority of NYCHA developments were built between 1945 and 1965. Unlike most cities, New York depended heavily on city and state funds to build its housing after the Federal Housing Act of 1937 expired and a new bill wasn't agreed upon until the Federal Housing Act of 1949, rather than just the federal government. Most of the postwar developments had over 1,000 apartment units each, and most were built in the modernist, tower-in-the-park style popular at the time. In the 1950s and 1960s, many New Yorkers, including supporters, became more critical of the agency and in response NYCHA introduced a new look that included variations of height, faster elevators, and larger apartments. In 1958, Mayor Robert F. Wagner Jr. began to shift construction away from megaprojects to smaller sites which retained the street grid and had under 1,000 units.

In 1964, NYCHA ended a policy that held apartments for white tenants in an attempt to integrate the developments. Tenants organized a rent strike in opposition to the policy and the State Commission of Human Rights questioned if the policy was in accordance to the state's laws on discrimination. 

In 1995, the New York City Housing Authority Police Department and the New York City Transit Police were merged into the New York City Police Department by NYC Mayor Rudolph W. Giuliani and continues today as the New York City Police Department Housing Bureau.

Governance and operations 
NYCHA is a public-benefit corporation, controlled by the Mayor of New York City, and organized under the State's Public Housing Law. The NYCHA ("NYCHA Board") consists of seven members, of which the chairman is appointed by and serves at the pleasure of the Mayor of New York City, while the others are appointed for three-year terms by the mayor. The board includes three members who are residents of public housing, and a board chair who also serves as NYCHA’s chief executive officer.

The Authority is the largest public housing authority (PHA) in North America. In spite of many problems, it is still considered by experts to be the most successful big-city public housing authority in the country. Whereas most large public housing authorities in the United States (Chicago, St. Louis, Baltimore, etc.) have demolished their high-rise projects and in most cases replaced them with lower density housing, New York's continue to be fully occupied. Most of its market-rate housing is also in high-rise buildings.

NYCHA also administers a citywide Section 8 Leased Housing Program in rental apartments. However, new applications for Section 8 have not been accepted since December 10, 2009.

New York also maintains a long waiting list for its apartments. Because of demand, the Housing Authority in recent years, has selected more "working families" from applicants to diversify the income structure of occupants of its housing, as had been typical of residents who first occupied the facilities. NYCHA's Conventional Public Housing Program has 175,636 apartments (as of 2018) in 325 developments throughout the city.

NYCHA has approximately 13,000 employees serving about 173,946 families and approximately 392,259 authorized residents. Based on the 2010 census, NYCHA's Public Housing represents 8.2% of the city's rental apartments and is home to 4.9% of the city's population. NYCHA residents and Section 8 voucher holders combined occupy 12.4% of the city's rental apartments.

List of chairpersons

Capital needs
In 2004, NYCHA contracted with the Architectural/Engineering firm Parsons Brinckerhoff Quade and Douglas to perform a needs assessment survey of all 2500+ properties owned by the agency (excluding FHA Homes, which were inspected by in-house NYCHA personnel in about 2007). In 2005, a report was released detailing the conditions of every aspect and building component of each individual property, based on a scale of 1 to 5 (in this case, 1 being the highest or best rating, and 5 being the lowest, or poorest rating). This report identified $6.9 billion in needs required to bring the Authority's structures into a state of good repair. In 2011/12, a second needs assessment survey was done by PBQ&D, which identified $16.5 billion in needs. This represented an average of $93,000 per unit. It is anticipated that an upcoming needs assessment contract will reveal capital needs in excess of $25 billion. The needs assessment survey is divided into five broad categories, which are: Architectural, Mechanical, Electrical, Site, and Apartments. Given the large number of apartment units within NYCHA, the report's findings on apartments are based upon an inspection of 5% of NYCHA's total inventory.

In mid-2007, NYCHA faced a $225 million budget shortfall.

In late 2015, NYCHA announced the formation of the Fund for Public Housing, a nonprofit organization that will seek to raise $200 million over three years to supplement NYCHA's efforts and improve the lives of NYC public housing residents. The Fund received its first donation of $100,000 from the Deutsche Bank in December 2015. Also in 2015 Mayor Bill de Blasio released a plan called Next Gen NYCHA to address funding and maintenance concerns by "revamping management practices and generate revenue by building mixed-income and affordable housing on what the city deemed underused NYCHA land, and by using new federal programs to shift NYCHA apartments over to Section 8, a more stable source of federal funding".

In 2018, a city-wide survey of NYCHA properties found that the organization needs $31.8 billion over five years to address unmet capital repairs including replacing broken elevators, upgrading faulty heating systems, and fix run-down kitchens and bathrooms. Despite its needed repairs, the Department of Housing and Urban Development (HUD) is cutting the agency's budget to encourage NYCHA to rely on partnerships with private property managers while Governor Andrew Cuomo is withholding his multiyear funding of $550 million until a federally required monitor is appointed to oversee the housing authority. Later that year, the de Blasio administration announced a plan, called NYCHA 2.0, to address the capital needs of the agency which includes converting 62,000 NYCHA apartments into Section 8 and bringing in private management to oversee the backlog of repairs for the apartments, and selling air rights over NYCHA property to raise money. The conversion of the properties would be under the Rental Assistance Demonstration (RAD) federal program leading to concerns that NYCHA would be privatized. If units were to be brought under RAD, oversight by the monitor and the court would be terminated leading to further concerns that the mold remediation ordered in the 2013 Baez lawsuit wouldn't happen. 

In 2019, the administration, under NYCHA 2.0, began considering demolishing and rebuilding the Fulton Houses in Chelsea and the Cooper Park Houses in Williamsburg through partnering with private developers and a 70-30 split of market-rate and affordable housing. Other developers began lobbying the city for air rights from Campos Plaza II, Fulton Houses, and the Ingersoll Houses. 

The approach of the administration, under NYCHA 2.0, is a turn back to Bloomberg-era initiatives of market rate infill that he once felt ignored the concerns of NYCHA residents after a failed trial of four buildings with a 50-50 split of market-rate and low-cost housing infill did not provide enough money under Next-Gen NYCHA. Then in July, 2020 NYCHA announced a new plan called A Blueprint for Change which would transfer 110,000 apartments to a newly created public entity - a Public Housing Preservation Trust. In February, 2021 the Chelsea NYCHA Working Group released their plan for the Elliott-Chelsea Houses and the Fulton Houses and the city released an RFP for it.

Hurricane Sandy and its impact on NYCHA
In October, 2012, Hurricane Sandy turned out to be the single most destructive event in the history of the New York City Housing Authority. The storm impacted approximately 10% of NYCHA's developments, which left 400 buildings without power, and 386 buildings without heat and hot water.

In February 2014, NYCHA's Recovery and Resilience Department was created bringing about initial agreements in over $3 billion in funding for over 33 developments by March 2015. In August 2015, the first construction began on Lower East Side V. In December 2015, NYCHA received $3 billion in disaster recovery funding and by December 2016, $201 million of construction was underway. By December 2017, $1.85 billion in contracts were awarded, and construction was underway at 27 developments. Construction at all Sandy-impacted sites are expected to be completed by the end of 2021.

Lawsuits

Tenant lawsuit
In February 2018, attorney Jim Walden filed a lawsuit on behalf of 400,000 NYCHA tenants living in squalid conditions. The suit demands that the court appoint an independent monitor to oversee NYCHA because the agency failed to provide tenants with heat and hot water, keep residents safe from lead, involve tenants in policy-making, and hire residents, as required under federal law. In April 2018, under intense pressure from the lawsuit, chairwoman Shola Olatoye resigned.

Federal lawsuit
On June 11, 2018, U.S. Attorney Geoffrey Berman filed a lawsuit accusing NYCHA of violating health and safety regulations, exposing children to lead paint, and training its workers to deceive inspectors under the oversight of chairwoman Shola Olatoye from 2012 to 2016. According to federal prosecutors, deceptions NYCHA workers used included shutting off buildings' water supplies during inspections to hide leaks and building false walls out of plywood to hide dilapidated rooms from inspectors. That day, NYCHA settled the lawsuit by admitting to the allegations, agreeing to spend an additional $1 billion over the next four years, and by agreeing to oversight by a federal monitor. In 2019, the federal government reached an agreement with the city to appoint a federal monitor and $2.2 billion spent by the city over the next decade on repair to avoid a federal takeover. In February 2019, federal officials chose Bart Schwartz as the NYCHA monitor.

Statistics
335 developments in New York City
Staten Island has 10 developments with 4,499 apartments
Queens has 22 developments with 17,126 apartments
The Bronx has 100 developments with 44,500 apartments
Brooklyn has 98 developments with 58,669 apartments
Manhattan has 102 developments with 53,890 apartments
The Bronx's largest development is Edenwald Houses in Edenwald with 2,036 apartments.
Brooklyn's largest development is Red Hook Houses in Red Hook with 2,878 apartments.
Manhattan's largest development is Baruch Houses on the Lower East Side with 2,391 apartments
Staten Island's largest development is Stapleton Houses in Stapleton with 693 apartments.
10 developments consisting of FHA Acquired Homes are located in more than one borough and total 200 apartments
42 developments are for seniors only; 15 seniors-only buildings exist within mixed-population developments
NYCHA has approximately 9,822 apartments designated for seniors only
There also are 7,639 retrofitted apartments for families of persons who are mobility impaired as of September 30, 2007
As of April 13, 2017: 14 developments are at least 70 years old; a total of 60 developments are 60 to 69 years old; there are 75 developments 50 to 59 years old; another 89 developments are 40 to 49 years old, and 52 developments are 30 to 39 years old.
The combined demographics of all public housing developments in New York City is about 46% Black, 44% Hispanic, 4% White, 5% Asian, and 1% other.
NYCHA residents in Chelsea earn significantly less money than the average Chelsea resident and are almost half as likely to have a college degree.
The Queensbridge Houses in Long Island City, Queens, is now North America's largest housing project with 3,142 apartments, following the demolition of several larger Chicago housing projects, including the Cabrini–Green Homes and the Robert Taylor Homes (whose 4,321 three, four and five bedroom apartments once made it the largest public housing project in the world).
The Bronzeville section of Chicago now has the highest concentration of low income public housing in America, following the demolition of a huge 5-mile long tract of public housing stretching along State and Federal on Chicago's South Side. While pre-Plan For Transformation Chicago Housing Authority high-rise developments tended to be much larger and more concentrated than those of the NYCHA, the NYCHA operates several times as many apartments and houses three times as many residents. East Harlem in Manhattan has the second highest concentration of public housing in the nation, closely following Bronzeville.

See also
 Public housing in the United States
 Mitchell-Lama Housing Program
 La Guardia and Wagner Archives
 Rent control in New York
 Developing Lives
 New York City Department of Housing Preservation and Development
 Project Lives

References

External links

 
La Guardia and Wagner Archives/New York City Housing Authority Collection

Public benefit corporations in New York (state)
Government of New York City
 
1934 establishments in New York City